Robin Boyd may refer to:

 Robin Boyd (architect) (1919–1971), Australian architect, writer, teacher and social commentator
 Robin Boyd (theologian) (1924–2018), Irish theologian and missionary to India